Top Country Albums is a chart that ranks the top-performing country music albums in the United States, published by Billboard.  In 2002, 11 different albums topped the chart, based on electronic point of sale data provided by SoundScan Inc.

In the issue of Billboard dated January 5, Scarecrow by Garth Brooks was at number one, its sixth week atop the chart.  Two weeks later it was displaced by the soundtrack album of the film O Brother, Where Art Thou?, which was one of two albums to spend 11 weeks at number one during the year, the most by a single record.  The second album to occupy the peak position for 11 weeks was No Shoes, No Shirt, No Problems by Kenny Chesney, which did so in two spells between May and July.  Both albums also topped the all-genre Billboard 200 chart, as did most of the year's other country number ones, reflecting country music's high level of popularity and sales at the time; the genre's sales increased in 2002 even while overall music sales declined.  The O Brother, Where Art Thou? soundtrack, which had spent 24 weeks at number one on the country chart in 2001, returned to the top of that listing and finally topped the Billboard 200 after more than 60 weeks on the chart following it winning the Grammy Award for Album of the Year in March 2002.

The only albums to reach number one on the Top Country Albums listing but not top the Billboard 200 were both by acts making their first appearance at number one on the country chart.  In August, Darryl Worley spent a single week at number one with his first chart-topper, I Miss My Friend.  Three months later, the group Rascal Flatts reached the top spot for the first time with Melt, which also spent one week at number one.  The year's final number one was Up! by Shania Twain, which entered the chart at number one in the issue of Billboard dated December 7, and remained atop the chart for the remainder of the year.  Twain had achieved huge success over the preceding five years, particularly with the album Come On Over, which is recognized as the highest-selling album of all time by a female artist, as well as the biggest-selling country album.  Up!, however, would prove to be her final album of new material before she went on a lengthy hiatus from the music industry due to medical and personal issues.

Chart history

References

2002
2002 record charts